The 1st Brigade is currently the largest unit of the New Zealand Army, and contains most of the army's deployable units. The brigade was formed on 13 December 2011 by amalgamating the 2nd Land Force Group and 3rd Land Force Group. Its establishment formed part of the 'Army 2015' package of reforms.

Previous 1st Brigades in the New Zealand Army have included a brigade in the Middle East and France, 1916–19, a home defence formation active during the Second World War (part of the North Island home defence 1st Division), and a 1 Brigade / Integrated Expansion Force formed to direct three Territorial Force-formed battalions in the 1970s and 1980s.

History

First World War
The 1st Brigade came into being in Egypt in early 1916, when the New Zealand and Australian Division was re-organised in the wake of the Gallipoli Campaign, and the New Zealand Division was formed. Under the command of Brigadier General Harry Fulton, the brigade initially consisted of four infantry battalions, being the 1st Battalions of the Auckland, Canterbury, Otago and Wellington Regiments. In this configuration, the brigade was transferred to the Western Front in Europe, and fought through the Battle of the Somme before the New Zealand Division was restructured. This saw the brigade reconfigured, swapping its two South Island battalions (the 1st Canterbury and 1st Otago) with the two North Island battalions (2nd Auckland and 2nd Wellington) of the 2nd Brigade. This placed all the North Island battalions in the 1st Brigade while all the South Island formations were in the 2nd Brigade. Following this, the brigade fought in the Battle of Messines and the Third Battle of Ypres during 1917, before helping to turn back the German spring offensive in early 1918, and then taking part in the Allied Hundred Days Offensive in the final months of the war. After the armistice, the brigade was committed briefly to post war occupation duties until the New Zealand Division disbanded in early 1919.

Second World War 

The 1st Infantry Brigade was re-established prior to the Second World War as a Territorial Force formation manned by part-time reservists. At the outbreak of war on 3 September 1939, it formed part of the field force for the Northern District. At this time it commanded the 1st Hauraki Regiment (headquartered at Paeroa), 1st North Auckland Regiment (Whangarei) and 1st Waikato Regiment (Hamilton).

On 1 November 1941, the 1st Brigade became part of the newly formed Northern Division in the Northern Military District. The division's two brigades were the 1st and 12th Brigade Groups. Later the Northern Division became the 1st Division. The 12th Brigade Group was one of the new headquarters, and both these units continued to be manned by reservists. During early 1942, camps were constructed for the 1st Brigade Group in South Auckland and the 12th Brigade Group at Kaikohe. The 1st Brigade subsequently moved to a camp near Warkworth.

After the threat of invasion passed, the 1st Brigade and the other home defence formations were reduced in size during 1943. By the end of the year the seven brigade (including 1st Brigade) and three divisional headquarters comprised a total of 44 personnel, with the soldiers assigned to the Territorial Force units they once commanded having been demobilised. All of these headquarters were disbanded on 1 April 1944.

Post war 
In 1950, Northern Military District directed four subordinate Area Headquarters, being Area 1 (HQ Auckland), Area 2 (HQ Tauranga), Area 3 (HQ Whangarei), and Area 4 (HQ Hamilton).

In 1963, the Combat Brigade Group (1st Brigade) was established, based on the Northern Military District headquarters at Auckland. Headquarters Northern Military District was disestablished in 1970 and the headquarters became home to Field Force Command.

Reformation 

In 2011 the 1st Brigade was reformed from the headquarters of the 2nd Land Force Group at Linton Camp. Its role upon formation was to command all of the New Zealand Army's operational units, other than the 1st New Zealand Special Air Service Regiment.

As of December 2011, the brigade comprised:
Headquarters, 1st Brigade (Linton Military Camp)
1st Battalion, Royal New Zealand Infantry Regiment (Linton Military Camp)
2/1st Battalion, Royal New Zealand Infantry Regiment (Burnham Military Camp)
Queen Alexandra's Mounted Rifles (Burnham Military Camp)
16th Field Regiment, Royal Regiment of New Zealand Artillery (Linton Military Camp)
2nd Engineer Regiment (Linton Military Camp)
1st Signals Regiment (Linton Military Camp)
2nd Combat Service Support Battalion (Linton Military Camp)
3rd Combat Service Support Battalion (Burnham Military Camp)
2nd Health Services Battalion (Linton Military Camp)
1st Military Police Company (Trentham Military Camp)

Order of Battle 2020 
Correct as at 28 February 2020:
 1st (New Zealand) Brigade
 Headquarters, 1st Brigade (Linton Military Camp)
 1st Command Support Regiment (Linton Military Camp)
 1st (New Zealand) Military Intelligence Company
 1st Signal Squadron
 2nd Signal Squadron
 3rd Signal Squadron (Electronic Warfare) (Burnham Camp)
 4th Signal Squadron (Burnham Camp)
 25 Cypher Section
 Queen Alexandra's Mounted Rifles (Linton Military Camp)
 Wellington East Coast Squadron
 Scots Squadron
 Waikato Mounted Rifles Squadron (Hamilton)
 Support Squadron
 Delta Squadron (inactive)
 1st Battalion, Royal New Zealand Infantry Regiment (Linton Military Camp)
 Alpha Company (inactive)
 Victor Company
 Whiskey Company 
 Support Company
 Combat Service Support Company
 2nd/1st Battalion, Royal New Zealand Infantry Regiment (Burnham Camp)
 Alpha Company
 Bravo Company
 Delta Company
 Support Company
 Depot Company
 Combat Service Support Company
 2/4 Battalion, Royal New Zealand Infantry Regiment (Burnham Camp)
 Alpha Company (Christchurch)
 Bravo Company (Dunedin)
 Charlie Company (Invercargill and Nelson)
 3/6 Battalion, Royal New Zealand Infantry Regiment (Papakura Military Camp)
 Northland Company (Whangarei)
 Auckland Company (Auckland)
 Hauraki Company (Tauranga)
 5/7 Battalion, Royal New Zealand Infantry Regiment (Trentham Military Camp)
 East Coast Company (Napier)
 Wellington Company (Wellington)
 West Coast Company (Whanganui)
 16th Field Regiment, Royal Regiment of New Zealand Artillery (Linton Military Camp)
 161 Battery
 163 Battery
 11/4 Battery (Papakura Military Camp)
 2nd Engineer Regiment, Royal New Zealand Engineers (Linton Military Camp)
 1st Field Squadron
 2nd Field Squadron
 3rd Field Squadron (Burnham Camp)
 25 Engineer Support Squadron
 Emergency Response Squadron
 2nd Combat Service Support Battalion, Royal New Zealand Army Logistic Regiment (Linton Military Camp)
 10th Transport Company
 21st Supply Company
 2nd Workshop Company
 5th Movements Company
 Combat Service Support Company (North)
 38th Combat Service Support Company (Army Reserves)
 3rd Combat Service Support Battalion, Royal New Zealand Army Logistic Regiment (Burnham Camp)
 3rd Transport Company
 3rd Catering & Supply Company
 3rd Workshop Company
 3 Reserve Company

See also
Structure of the New Zealand Army

Notes

References

External links 
 New Zealand Army, 1 Brigade Factsheet, 2018

Infantry brigades of New Zealand
Infantry brigades of New Zealand in World War II
Military units and formations established in 1916
1916 establishments in New Zealand
Brigades of New Zealand in World War I